Chris Eaton may refer to:

 Chris Eaton (tennis) (born 1987), British tennis player
 Chris Eaton (UK musician) (born 1958), contemporary Christian singer-songwriter
 Chris Eaton (Canadian musician) (born 1971), indie rock musician and author
 Chris Eaton (police officer) (born 1952), Australian police officer most notable as an investigator of sports betting scams, especially in association football
 Chris Eaton (politician) (born 1954), American politician
 Chris Eaton (rugby union) (born 1984), New Zealand rugby union player